Lithuania has 158.8 km of  narrow-gauge railway lines remaining, although only 68.4 km of them (serving five stations) are regularly used, employing 12 locomotives. They are included in the Registry of Immovable Cultural Heritage Sites of Lithuania.

gauge railways
 Švenčionėliai–Pastavy–Berezvetsh; 125 km opened in 1895. Most of the line was (and is now) in Belorussia. Švenčionėliai - Lyntupy stretch closed, Lyntypy - Berezvetch (Glubokoye) stretch regauged (1520 mm). 
 Švenčionėliai–Panevėžys; 145 km, opened in 1901. Švenčionėliai - Utena stretch regauded (1520 mm), Utena - Rubikiai stretch dismantled, and Rubikiai - Panevėžys stretch still working.

gauge military railways
 Panevėžys–Joniškėlis; 36 km
 Joniškėlis–Biržai; 42 km
 Joniškėlis–Žeimelis; 37 km
 Joniškėlis–Petrašiūnai (Pakruojis)–Šiauliai; 68 km
 Petrašiūnai (Pakruojis)–Linkuva; 7 km
 Joniškis-Žeimelis; 28 km, not converted to 750 mm gauge
World War I 600 mm (1 ft 11+5⁄8 in) field railway from Dūkštas, (Lithuania) to Druja. After takeover by Poland, the PKP regauged the line to 750 mm (2 ft 5+1⁄2 in) in 1932. After World War II the large part of the line was in Belorussia, the railway closed in the 1970s.

Other
 Vilnius pioneer railway, 1,6 km in the Vingis Park in Vilnius
 There are also many peat factories, which have private narrow-gauge railways for transportation of peat from field to factory.

See also
 Aukštaitija narrow gauge railway

References